Glentress Forest is located near Peebles in the Scottish Borders, about 30 miles south of Edinburgh. Part of the Tweed Valley Forest Park along with Traquair Forest in Innerleithen, it is the home of a mountain biking centre which is one of the 7stanes mountain bike trails operated throughout southern Scotland by Forestry and Land Scotland.

There are currently 5 mountain bike waymarked routes and a freeride park in Glentress Forest. The historic cycle trails, aimed at children and families, provide an interesting way to explore the forest and its history. The blue, red, and black mountain bike routes provide a challenge for all abilities. The red route is noted for a high-speed section with many bermed corners known as Spooky Woods. The green trail is a "skills loop", and is designed for those new to mountain biking, although there are some challenges for those wishing to practice rocky sections or raised wooden trails too.

History

During the 1930s, unemployed men were set to work in Glentress Forest, breaking ground, building tracks, and undertaking other heavy labour. The men lived in a work camp at Eshiels, which was one of a number of so-called Instructional Centres run by the Ministry of Labour in order to 'harden' young men who had been out of work for some time. By 1938, the Ministry was operating 35 Instructional Centres across Britain, with a total capacity of over 6,000 places. By 1939, unemployment was declining in the face of impending war, and the Ministry closed down its work camps.
The forest itself was planted in the 1920s in response to the national shortage of timber brought about by the First World War. Some of the original stands of Douglas Fir still remain to this day. There are remains of an Iron Age hill fort at the top of Janet's Brae which offers a spectacular vista over the town of Peebles. A short walk will lead to the site where a reconstruction of a timber round house from the same Iron Age period used to stand until it was burnt down in 2010.

See also
List of places in the Scottish Borders
List of places in Scotland

External links
Forestry Commission Scotland - Glentress Forest
7stanes – Scotland's Biking Heaven
Glentress Trail Map (PDF)
A trail guide for Glentress at Mountain Bikes Apart
RIDELINES Mountain Bike Tuition - A local company offering mountain bike tuition at Glentress and guided rides in the Tweed Valley

References

John Field, "Learning Through Labour: Training, unemployment and the state, 1890-1939", Leeds University Press, 1992, 

Forests and woodlands of Scotland
Mountain biking venues in the United Kingdom